CryptLoad is a discontinued freeware download manager for Microsoft Windows that downloads files from file-hosting websites such as RapidShare and Megaupload. Its primary function is to automate the process of receiving, joining and extracting multi-part downloads. Version 1.1.8.0 of 2 September 2009 was current . Version 1.1.8.0 is still the latest version as of March 2, 2017.

References

External links

CryptLoad wiki
Brief Computerbild.de Review 
Brief Chip.de Review 

Download managers
Windows-only freeware